Giulia Iannotti (born 14 February 1978) is an Italian sports shooter. She competed in the women's trap event at the 2000 Summer Olympics.

References

1978 births
Living people
Italian female sport shooters
Olympic shooters of Italy
Shooters at the 2000 Summer Olympics
Sportspeople from Naples